A Rose for the Apocalypse is Draconian's fifth studio album released June 23, 2011, through Napalm Records.

A music video was made for the track "The Last Hour of Ancient Sunlight".

Track listing

Personnel
Lisa Johansson - vocals
Anders Jacobsson - vocals
Johan Ericson - lead guitar, backing vocals
Daniel Arvidsson - rhythm guitar
Fredrik Johansson - bass
Jerry Torstensson - drums, percussion

Production
Arranged and produced by Draconian
Recorded and engineered by David Castillo & Johan Ornborg
Mixed and mastered by Jens Bogren

References

"A Rose for the Apocalypse" at discogs.com link

2011 albums
Draconian (band) albums
Napalm Records albums
Albums produced by Jens Bogren